The Meteor spacecraft are weather observation satellites launched by the Soviet Union and Russia.  The Meteor satellite series was initially developed during the 1960s. The Meteor satellites were designed to monitor atmospheric and sea-surface temperatures, humidity, radiation, sea ice conditions, snow-cover, and clouds. Between 1964 and 1969 a total of eleven Soviet Union Meteor satellites were launched.

Satellites

Meteor Prototype
 Meteor Prototype launches

Meteor-1
Meteor 1 was a set of fully operational Russian meteorological satellite launched from the Plesetsk site. The satellites were placed in a near-circular, near-polar prograde orbit to provide near-global observations of the earth's weather systems, cloud cover, ice and snow fields, and reflected and emitted radiation from the dayside and nightside of the earth-atmosphere system for operational use by the Soviet Hydrometeorological Service. 31 satellites were launched between 1969 and 1981.

 Meteor-1 launches

Meteor 1-25, also called "Meteor-Priroda-2", launched on May 15, 1976 by the USSR out of Plesetskon a Vostok-2M. It was a meteorological satellite that provided global observations of the earth's weather systems, cloud cover, ice and snow fields, vertical profiles of temperature and moisture, and reflected and emitted radiation from the dayside and nightside of the earth-atmosphere system for operational use by the Soviet Hydrometeorological Service. It carried an East German-designed experimental infrared Fourier spectrometers for on-orbit testing of the new instrument for weather observation. The satellite ceased operations on May 15, 1978 and is now a derelict spacecraft.

Meteor-2
The Meteor-2 series, based on the Meteor-1, was the second generation of Soviet meteorological satellites. They were launched into orbit at first by the Vostok-2M launch vehicle until that was replaced by the Tsyklon-3 launch vehicle in the early 1980s. Between 1975 and 1993, 21 Meteor-2's were launched. They were flown in non-sun-synchronous polar orbits with altitudes between 850 and 950 km and inclinations of 81-82º. They weighed about 1300 kg and had two solar arrays.

The instruments consisted of three television-type (frame technique) VIS and IR scanners, a five-channel scanning radiometer and a radiometer (RMK-2) for measuring radiation flux densities in the near-Earth space.

In addition to its regular payload, Meteor-2 21 carried a unique Fizeau Retro Reflector Array (RRA) for Satellite Laser Ranging applications.

Several of the satellites have begun to break up and create debris. #16 broke up in 1998 after a propulsion failure. #18 broke up the following year for unknown reasons. #4 broke up in March 2004. #17 broke up in June 2005.

Meteor-2-2
Meteor 2-2 launched on January 6, 1977 by the USSR out of Plesetskon a Vostok 2-M with 1st Generation Upper Stage. It was an earth science satellite that performed cloud observation and IR temperature/humidity sounding.
It ceased operations on July 6, 1978. Since then the satellite had broken up into several pieces of debris.

Meteor-2-5
Meteor 2-5 launched on October 31, 1979 by the USSR out of Plesetskon a Vostok 2-M with 1st Generation Upper Stage. It has undergone several breakup events, the first before January 2005 and the last as recently as 2013 or 2014, resulting in 83 known pieces of which 60 were still on-orbit as of 2019.

Meteor 2-7
Meteor 2-7 launched on May 14, 1981 by the USSR out of Plesetsk on a Vostok 2-M with 1st Generation Upper Stage. It had a weight of 2750 kg, and contained the usual suite of communication and orbit control equipment powered by large solar arrays. It's mission was cloud observation and IR temperature/humidity sounding, using a Radiation Measurement Complex (RMk-2), Infrared Sounding Radiometer, Television Camera and Infrared Instrument. It ceased operations on November 14, 1982. In March 2004, it experienced an event, or a series of events, that caused it to break into 8 pieces. The cause of this break-up is unknown.

Meteor 2-8
Meteor 2-8 launched on March 25, 1982 by the USSR out of Plesetsk on a Tsyklon-3 It had a weight of 1500 kg, and It carried scientific and meteorological instruments, and service systems. It's mission was cloud observation and IR temperature/humidity sounding, using a Radiation Measurement Complex (RMk-2), Infrared Sounding Radiometer, Television Camera and Infrared Instrument. It ceased operations on September 25, 1983. On May 29, 1999 it experienced a break up event that caused it to break into 53 pieces. The cause of this break-up is unknown.

Meteor-2-21
Meteor-2-21/Fizeau is the twenty-first and last in the Meteor-2 series of Russian meteorological satellites.

ILRS Mission Support Status: Satellite Laser Ranging (SLR) tracking support of this satellite was discontinued in October 1998. What makes Meteor-2-21 distinctive from the other meteorological satellites is its unique retroreflector array. The name Fizeau is derived from a French physicist, Armand Fizeau who, in 1851, conducted an experiment which tested for the aether convection coefficient. SLR tracking of this satellite was used for precise orbit determination and the Fizeau experiment. The Fizeau experiment tests the theory of special relativity – that distance events that are simultaneous for one observer will not be simultaneous for another observer who is in motion relative to the first observer.

Retroreflector Array (RRA) Characteristics: The retro-reflector array consists of three corner cubes in a linear array with the two outer corner cubes pointing at 45 degree angles relative to the central cube. The central cube is made of fused silica and has a two-lobe Far Field Diffraction Pattern (FFDP) providing nearly equal intensities for compensated and uncompensated velocity aberration. Both outer reflectors have aluminum coating on the reflecting surfaces and near-diffraction-limited FFDPs. One of the end reflectors is made of fused silica with an index of refraction of 1.46 and should provide partial compensation of the velocity aberration. The other end reflector is made of fused glass with an index of refraction of 1.62 and should provide a perfect compensation of the velocity aberration.

SLR full-rate data from MOBLAS 4, MOBLAS 7, and Maidanak seem to confirm the presence of the compensating influence of the Fizeau effect. Resur-1, another Russian satellite launched in 1994, has 2 corner cubes reflectors with near diffraction-limited FFDPs, which were specifically designed for the continuation of this experiment. WESTPAC, a future SLR satellite, will verify indisputably the existence or otherwise of the Fizeau effect.

Instrumentation:  Meteor-2-21/Fizeau had the following instrumentation on board:
 Scanning telephotometer
 Scanning infrared radiometers
 Radiation measurement complex
 Retroreflector array

Meteor-Priroda
 Meteor-Priroda launches

Meteor-3

The Meteor-3 series was launched 7 times between 1984 and 1994 after a difficult and protracted development program that began in 1972. All the satellites were launched on Tsyklon-3 rockets. These satellites provide weather information including data on clouds, ice and snow cover, atmospheric radiation and humidity. The Meteor-3 class of satellites orbit in a higher altitude than the Meteor-2 class of satellites thus providing more complete coverage of the Earth's surface. The Meteor-3 has the same payload as the Meteor-2 but also includes an advanced scanning radiometer with better spectral and spatial resolution and a spectrometer for determining total ozone content. Meteorological data is transmitted to four primary sites in the former Soviet Union in conjunction with about 80 other smaller sites.

 Meteor-3 launches

Meteor-3-5
Meteor-3-5, launched in 1991, is in a slightly higher orbit than Meteor-2-21, and operated until 1994. It transmitted on 137.300 MHz. Mechanically, it is similar to Meteor-2-21. Which satellite was in operation depended on the sun angles and consequently the seasons. Meteor-3-5 was usually the (Northern Hemisphere) "summer" satellite while 2-21 was in operation for approximately the half-year centered on winter. The satellite carried the second Total Ozone Mapping Spectrometer (TOMS) aloft as the first and the last American-built instrument to fly on a Soviet spacecraft. Launched from the Plesetsk, Russia, facility near the White Sea, on 15 August 1991, Meteor-3 TOMS had a unique orbit that presents special problems for processing data.  Meteor-3 TOMS began returning data in August 1991 and stopped in December 1994.

Meteor-3-6/PRARE
The Meteor-3-6/PRARE satellite is the sixth in the Russian Meteor-3 series of meteorological satellites launched in 1994.

ILRS Mission Support Status: Satellite laser ranging and PRARE data was used for precision orbit determination and intercomparison of the two techniques. ILRS tracking support of this satellite was discontinued on 11 November 1995.

Instrumentation:  Meteor-3-6 has the following instrumentation on board:

 Scanning TV-sensor
 Visible light and infrared radiometers
 Scanning infrared radiometer
 Ozone Mapper
 Precise Range and Range-Rate Equipment (PRARE)
 Retroreflector array

RetroReflector Array (RRA) Characteristics: The retro-reflector array is a box wing annulus with a diameter of 28 cm and has 24 corner cube reflectors.

Meteor-3M

  
The Meteor-3M series of satellites was to be an advanced series of polar orbiters with one 1.4 km resolution visible channel and a ten-channel radiometer with 3 km resolution. Initially four Meteor-3M satellites were planned, however due to financial difficulties only one was launched.

Meteor-M

The first Meteor-M satellite, Meteor-M No.1, was launched 17 September 2009 16:55:07 UTC from Baikonur by a Soyuz-2-1b/Fregat rocket. Its mission ended in 2014.

The second satellite, Meteor-M No.2, was launched 8 July 2014 16:58:28 UTC from Baikonur by a Soyuz-2-1b/Fregat rocket. Its mission is scheduled to last 5 years.

On 27 November 2017, the launch of Meteor-M No.2-1 was lost after a programming error; also lost were 18 smaller satellites from other nations.

On 5 July 2019, the replacement satellite for the failed Meteor-M No.2-1 satellite, the Meteor-M No.2-2 (also known as Meteor M2-2) was launched from Vostochny cosmodrome.

On 18 December 2019, image downlink from Meteor-M No.2-2 ceased. Tracking revealed the craft had suffered degradation in orbit with a  decrease in perigee. NORAD was not able to identify any space object involved in a collision. Roscosmos later confirmed that the satellite had suffered a decompression of its thermal control system following what is presumed to be a micrometeoroid impact. Following the incident, the spacecraft was automatically switched into a low-power mode and ground operators worked to restore the satellite's orbit and orientation. By 25 December 2019, the satellite had resumed controlled flight, but the future of its mission remains uncertain.
 
More Meteor-M satellites are currently being developed. As of August 2022, Meteor-M No.2-3 and No.2-4 are scheduled for launch in 2023, No.2-5 in 2024, and No.2-6 in 2025.

See also

 Elektro–L, Russian geosynchronous meteorological satellites

References

External links

 VNIIEM description of Meteor-M
 Sputnik server
 eoPortal Meteor overview
 NOAA description of Meteor
 NASA - Goddard Space Flight Center Scientific Visualization Studio
 NASA International Laser Ranging Service (ILRS)
 NASA ILRS Meteor 3-6
 NASA ILRS Meteor 2-21/Fizeau
 NASA ILRS Meteor 3M

Weather satellites of the Soviet Union

Earth observation satellites of the Soviet Union
Satellite series
Derelict satellites orbiting Earth
Spacecraft that broke apart in space